Odbojkarski klub Kamnik, known as Calcit Volley or Calcit Kamnik due to sponsorship reasons, is a Slovenian women's volleyball team from Kamnik. The team competes in the Slovenian Volleyball League and in MEVZA League.

History
In 2015, the women's section of Calcit Volley merged with OK Vital, relocated to Ljubljana and renamed as Calcit Ljubljana. The club returned to Kamnik after the 2016–17 season.

Honours

Slovenian Volleyball League
 Winners (6): 2009–10, 2014–15, 2015–16, 2019–20, 2020–21, 2021–22
Slovenian Volleyball Cup
 Winners (4): 2012–13, 2013–14, 2018–19, 2021–22
MEVZA League
 Winners (3): 2013–14, 2015–16, 2019–20

Players

2021−22 team

Source: Volleyball Federation of Slovenia

References

External links
 Official website 

Slovenian volleyball clubs
Volleyball clubs established in 1947
1947 establishments in Slovenia
Women's volleyball teams
Kamnik